Andrushchenko is a Ukrainian surname. Notable people with the surname include:

 Maksym Andrushchenko (born 1999), Ukrainian footballer
 Nikolay Andrushchenko (1943–2017), Russian journalist
 Tetyana Andrushchenko (born 1977), Ukrainian road cyclist
 Viktor Andrushchenko (born 1986), Ukrainian ice hockey player

See also
 

Ukrainian-language surnames